Mingozzi is an Italian surname. Notable people with the surname include:

Fulvio Mingozzi (1925–2000), Italian actor
Gianfranco Mingozzi (1932–2009), Italian film director and screenwriter
Gionata Mingozzi (1984–2008), Italian footballer

See also
Mengozzi

Italian-language surnames